Jarrod Wilson (born February 9, 1994) is an American football safety who is a free agent. He was signed as an undrafted free agent by the Jacksonville Jaguars after the 2016 NFL Draft. He played college football at Michigan.

Professional career

Jacksonville Jaguars
On April 30, 2016, the Jacksonville Jaguars signed Wilson to a three-year, $1.62 million contract that includes a signing bonus of $5,000 as an undrafted free agent. Throughout training camp, Wilson competed for a roster spot as a backup safety against James Sample and Josh Evans.

He made the team's 53-man roster on September 3, 2016. He played in all 16 games recording eight tackles.

In 2018, Wilson played in all 16 games primarily on special teams and as a backup safety. He made his first career start at strong safety in Week 16 against the Miami Dolphins. He finished the season with 21 tackles, two passes defensed, and a forced fumble.

On January 19, 2019, Wilson signed a three-year contract extension with the Jaguars through the 2021 season.

On September 14, 2020, Wilson was placed on injured reserve with a hamstring injury. He was activated on October 10, 2020.

On August 31, 2021, Wilson was released by the Jacksonville Jaguars.

New York Jets
On September 6, 2021, Wilson was signed to the New York Jets practice squad. He was promoted to the active roster on September 14. Wilson was released on October 7, and was re-signed to the practice squad that same day. He was promoted to the active roster on October 26, but was released four days later. Wilson was re-signed to the active roster on November 2. On December 7, 2021, Wilson was released.

San Francisco 49ers
On December 9, 2021, Wilson was signed to the San Francisco 49ers practice squad. He was promoted to the active roster on December 23. He was waived on January 25, 2022 and re-signed to the practice squad.

New York Giants
On August 1, 2022, the New York Giants signed Wilson. On August 14, 2022, Wilson was waived.

References

External links
Jacksonville Jaguars bio
Michigan Wolverines bio

1994 births
Living people
Players of American football from Akron, Ohio
American football safeties
Michigan Wolverines football players
Jacksonville Jaguars players
New York Jets players
San Francisco 49ers players
New York Giants players